Faveria dionysia is a species of moth in the family Pyralidae. It was described by Zeller in 1846. It is found in Spain, Portugal, Italy, Greece, Iraq, Namibia, South Africa, Gambia and the United Arab Emirates.

References

Moths described in 1846
Phycitini
Insects of Namibia
Moths of Europe
Moths of Africa
Moths of Asia